Lymington New Forest Hospital is a community hospital in Lymington, Hampshire. It is managed by the Southern Health NHS Foundation Trust.

History
The hospital was procured under a Private Finance Initiative contract to replace the old Lymington Hospital in 2004. It was designed by Murphy Philipps Architects and constructed by Ryhurst at a cost of £36 million. The hospital was opened on 6 February 2007 by Princess Anne.
 
The hospital houses a diagnostic treatment centre, several specialist outpatient clinics, two operating theatres, two endoscopy suites, medical and surgical day units, a medical unit including stroke rehabilitation and a surgical ward.  The radiology department has three radiology rooms, a 1.5T MRI scanner, a 64-slice CT scanner, a DEXA scanner and two ultra sound suites. The hospital also has a fluoroscopy unit, which opened in January 2014.

See also
 List of hospitals in England

References

External links 
 
 Inspection reports from the Care Quality Commission

Southern Health NHS Foundation Trust
Hospital buildings completed in 2007
Lymington
Hospitals in Hampshire
NHS hospitals in England